Pap Kiadeh may refer to:
 Bala Pap Kiadeh
 Mian Mahalleh-ye Pap Kiadeh
 Pain Pap Kiadeh